Canary originally referred to the island of Gran Canaria on the west coast of Africa, and the group of surrounding islands (the Canary Islands). It may also refer to:

Animals

Birds
 Canaries, birds in the genera Serinus and Crithagra including, among others:
 Atlantic canary (Serinus canaria), a small wild bird
 Domestic canary, Serinus canaria domestica, a small pet or aviary bird, also responsible for the "canary yellow" color term
 Yellow canary (Serinus flaviventris), a small bird

Fish
 Canary damsel (Similiparma lurida), fish of the family Pomacentridae, found in the eastern Atlantic Ocean
 Canary moray (Gymnothorax bacalladoi), an eel of the family Muraenidae
 Canary rockfish (Sebastes pinniger), of the family Sebastidae, found in the northeast Pacific Ocean

People
 Canary Burton (born 1942), American keyboardist, composer and writer
 Canary Conn (born 1949), American entertainer and author
 Bill Canary (fl. 1994), Republican campaign consultant in Alabama, Georgia, U.S.
 Richard Canary (born in 1962), American mathematician at the University of Michigan
 David Canary (1938–2015), American actor

Places
 Canary District, a housing development in Toronto, Canada
 Canary Islands, Spain
 Canary Wharf, Isle of Dogs, London, United Kingdom

Arts and entertainment
 Black Canary, a DC Comics superhero, first appeared in 1947
 Sara Lance/The Canary, a character on the television series Arrow, based on the DC Comics character
 Canary, a character in the manga and anime series Hunter × Hunter
 Canary dance, a Renaissance dance popular in Europe in the 16th and 17th centuries
 "Canary" (NCIS), a 2013 episode of the American television series NCIS 
 "The Canary" (short story), 1923 short story by Katherine Mansfield
 Canary (visual novel), released in 2000

Technology
 Canary release, a deployment cycle used by software developers to gradually roll out new features to a limited number of users
 Google Chrome Canary, pre-release version of the Chrome browser
 HTC Canary, the first smartphone to run Windows Mobile, released in November 2002
 Canary value, buffer overflow protection method in computer programming

Other uses
 Canary, LLC, an oilfield services company
 The Canary (website), a news media outlet created in 2015
 Canary melon, a yellow fruit
 Canary Current, a wind-driven surface current that is part of the North Atlantic Gyre
 Canaries, players for or supporters of Norwich City F.C.
 Canary sack, white fortified wine (sack) imported from the Canary Islands
 Canary wood (disambiguation), a name used to describe wood from a number of tree species
 Canary yellow, a shade of yellow
 Warrant canary, a published statement, the removal of which indicates the publisher received a National Security Letter

See also 
 Canaries (disambiguation)
 Canary trap, a method for exposing an information leak
 Calamity Jane Cannary (1852–1903), American frontierswoman
 Canarinho ("Little canary"), Brazilian football association team's nickname
 José Alberto "El Canario" (born 1958), Dominican salsa singer
 Conary (disambiguation)